Marc Magnan (born February 17, 1962) is a Canadian retired ice hockey player who played four games in the National Hockey League for the Toronto Maple Leafs during the 1982–83 season. The rest of his career, which lasted from 1982 to 1988, was spent in the minor leagues.

Magnan was born in Edmonton, Alberta. He played his junior ice hockey with the Lethbridge Broncos. After finishing his junior hockey in 1982, he joined the Maple Leafs organization and played for their minor league St. Catharines Saints team. He was called up for four game with Toronto that season, which turned out to be his only time in the NHL. He returned to the minor leagues and played five more seasons.

Career statistics

Regular season and playoffs

External links
 

1962 births
Living people
Canadian ice hockey left wingers
Flint Spirits players
Franco-Albertan people
Indianapolis Checkers players
Lethbridge Broncos players
Muskegon Mohawks players
St. Albert Saints players
St. Catharines Saints players
Ice hockey people from Edmonton
Toronto Maple Leafs draft picks
Toronto Maple Leafs players